Whidden's Marina is a historic marina in Boca Grande, Florida. It is located at 190 1st Street East. On December 28, 2000, it was added to the U.S. National Register of Historic Places.

This property is part of the Lee County Multiple Property Submission, a Multiple Property Submission to the National Register.

References

External links

 Lee County listings at National Register of Historic Places
 Whidden's Marina at Florida's Office of Cultural and Historical Programs

National Register of Historic Places in Lee County, Florida
Marinas in Florida
Gasparilla Island
Water transportation buildings and structures on the National Register of Historic Places
Transportation buildings and structures on the National Register of Historic Places in Florida